The Ouzoum or Ouzom (/ uzũ /) is a left tributary of the Gave de Pau, in the Southwest of France, between the Génie longue and the Béez.

It flows into the Gave in Nay, upstream from Pau.

Name 
Historical graphies were oscillating between the voiced -s- and the unvoiced -ss-: Oson (1441), Osom, Osson, Ozon (1538), le Lozon (1581), l'Ouson (1585).

This name could be related with the Pyrenean hydronym Ousse.

Geography 
The villages in the upper part of the valley (Arbéost and Ferrières) belong to the Hautes-Pyrénées and have relationships with the Val d'Azun, on the other side of the mountain.
On the other hand, the lower part of the valley, close to Pau, is Béarnese (Pyrénées-Atlantiques).

After the basin of Ferrières, the Ouzoum flows through a narrow pass bordered by steep limestone slopes. The valley widens after Arthez-d'Asson.

Its hydrographic regime is pluvio-nival.

Départements and towns 
 Hautes-Pyrénées: Arbéost, Ferrières
 Pyrénées-Atlantiques: Asson, Arthez-d'Asson, Igon, Nay.

References

Rivers of France
Rivers of Pyrénées-Atlantiques
Rivers of Nouvelle-Aquitaine